Frisian freedom was the absence of feudalism and serfdom in Frisia, the area that was originally inhabited by the Frisians. Historical Frisia included the modern provinces of Friesland and Groningen, and the area of West Friesland, in the Netherlands, and East Friesland in Germany. During the period of Frisian freedom the area did not have a sovereign lord who owned and administered the land. The freedom of the Frisians developed in the context of ongoing disputes over the rights of local nobility.

When, around 800, the Scandinavian Vikings first attacked Frisia, which was still under Carolingian rule, the Frisians were released from military service on foreign territory in order to be able to defend themselves against the Vikings. With their victory in the Battle of Norditi in 884 they were able to drive the Vikings permanently out of East Frisia, although it remained under constant threat. Over the centuries, whilst feudal lords reigned in the rest of Europe, no aristocratic structures emerged in Frisia. This 'freedom' was represented abroad by redjeven who were elected from among the wealthier farmers or from elected representatives of the autonomous rural municipalities. Originally the redjeven were all judges, so-called Asega, who were appointed by the territorial lords.

The killing of Arnulf, Count of Holland in 993 is the first sign of the Frisian freedom. This Frisian count was killed in a rebel attempt to compel obedience from his subjects. The murder of another Count Henri de Gras in 1101 is regarded as the de facto beginning of the Frisian freedom. This freedom was recognized by the German King William II on November 3, 1248. He did this after the Frisians aided in the siege of the city of Aachen. Later, Emperor Louis IV repealed these rights and granted Friesland to the County of Holland. In 1417 the status of the Frisians was reaffirmed by Emperor Sigismund.

Origins (800–1101)

Origin of the freedom privileges 

After Pope Leo III's expulsion from Rome by the city's nobility, Charlemagne mustered his forces to retake the city. According to one of the several legends: among this army were 700 Frisians, led by Magnus Forteman, who reconquered Rome and the Vatican. The original, if the story was historical at all, has been lost, although according to some it was inscribed on a wall of a church, which could be either at Almenum, Ferwâld or Aldeboarn. In 1319, more than five hundred years after the death of Charlemagne, a copy was entered in the register of William III of Holland. Most historians consider the  an invention from subsequent times and believe that all copies that have been found are forgeries; this includes the figure Magnus Forteman.

Other legends say the Frisians received their freedom from Charlemagne after the Frisians, under command of Magnus, freed Rome from the Saraceni or Saracens. In the Church of the Frisians in Rome there is still an eleventh-century inscription referring to Frisians fighting for the Holy Roman Empire against the Saracens in the south of Italy in the mid ninth century. The purpose of the inscription is to explain how Saint Magnus, an Italian bishop from the Roman Period, became patron of the church. It might explain how the name Magnus (and later the pedigree Forteman was added) became intermingled with the freedom sagas.

The first historical proof of freedom privileges is in AD 1248 when William II, count of Holland, was crowned Holy Roman Emperor in Aachen, in the presence of Frisians. Two days after his coronation he re-affirmed the allegedly freedom privileges. The second event was in AD 1417 when Holy Roman Emperor Sigismund gave the Frisians their freedom privileges, all based on the Frisians freedom claim for centuries. This charter has been preserved.

The aforementioned legends mostly regard the Mid-Frisians, i.e. Frisia west of the river Ems. The East Frisians, east of the river Ems, have yet another legend as to how they received their freedom. Out of gratitude King Charles the Fat offered the freedom privileges to the Frisians.

Regardless of the origins of the Frisian freedom, from the ninth century to the beginning of the sixteenth century Frisia went through a unique period of development, almost entirely lacking the feudal structure introduced by Charlemagne. All Frisians were granted the title of 'freemen', and given the right to elect their own  (magistrate-governor), a person that acted as a representative of the emperor who could organize the defense of Frisia, but held no executive power of their own. Magnus Forteman was elected as the first , but was killed while fighting the Abbasids in Anatolia. The  (i.e. the Swiss regions of Uri, Schwyz and Unterwalden) underwent a similar development to Frisia.

Viking raids (810–884) 
Around this time, Scandinavian Vikings began attacking Frisia. The Frisians were released from military service in order to be able to defend themselves against the Vikings. In 812, Gerulf the Elder was appointed Count of Frisia as Louis the Pious' vassal, and Vogt of the Westergoa in central Friesland. Already in the beginning of his reign, Louis, in an act of grace, had returned to the Frisians what they had lost earlier in their uprisings against his father. This act made the emperor popular among the Frisians but weakened the count's position towards the population. Taco Ludigman is said to have been elected Friesland's second potestaat around this time.

However, in 826, Louis the Pious ceded the county of Rüstringen to the Danish king Harald Klak. During his reign, the Frankish Empire had no effective fleet, and this made the coast of Frisia a weak point in the defense of his realm. The motivation for granting Harald a fief in Frisia possibly had to do with Harald committing himself to defending the Frisian coastline against future Viking raids. However, this was considerably interfering with the power of the counts of Friesland. It is presumed that in that time, Gerulf the Elder joined the opposition against the emperor. Adelbrik Adelen was elected the third potestaat in 830 and won victory over a Swedish duke at Kollum, but four years later Harald Klak's nephews Harald the Younger and Rorik of Dorestad began raiding the Frisian coast. Harald the Younger had entered into an alliance with Lothair I who was involved in conflict against Louis the Pious, his father. Frisia was part of Louis' lands and the raids were meant to weaken him. Harald Klak's brother died in 837 defending Walcheren from unidentified Viking raiders.

In 839 there was an uprising in Friesland against the emperor. During the kinstrife between Louis and his sons, Gerulf the Elder presumably took an active part in the movement against Louis, at the very least he lost his fiefs and his own estates were confiscated. On 8 May 839 after the reconciliation between Louis and his son Lothair, Gerulf's private properties around Leeuwarden and between Vlie and Lonbach were returned to him. By 841, Louis was dead and Lothair was able to grant Harald and Rorik several parts of Friesland. His goal at the time was to establish the military presence of his loyalists in Frisia, securing it against his siblings and political rivals Louis the German and Charles the Bald. However, in the early 840s, Frisia seemed to attract fewer raids than in the previous decade, Viking raiders were turning their attention to West Francia and Anglo-Saxon England. In 843, Lothair, Louis and Charles signed the Treaty of Verdun, settling their territorial disputes. Lothair previously needed Rorik and Harald to defend Frisia from external threats. With the seeming elimination of such threats, the two Vikings may have outlived their usefulness to their overlord. In about 844, both "fell into disgrace". They were accused of treason and imprisoned. The chronicles of the time report doubt on the accusation. Rorik would later manage to escape to the court of Louis the German. Harald the Younger probably died while a prisoner.

After Rorik, together with Godfrid Haraldsson (the son of Harald Klak), conquered Dorestad and Utrecht in 850, emperor Lothair I had to acknowledge him as ruler of most of Friesland. Dorestad had been one of the most prosperous ports in Northern Europe for quite some time. By accepting Rorik as one of his subjects, Lothair managed to keep the city as a part of his realm. His sovereignty was still recognized. For example, the coinage produced at the local mint would continue to bear the name of the Emperor. On the other hand, Dorestad was already in economic decline. Leaving it to its fate was not much of a risk for the welfare of his state.

In 855 Godfrid and Rorik tried to gain power in Denmark after the death of king Horik I. The attempt failed, and they returned the same year, taking back Dorestad.

A rumour soon circulated that Rorik had encouraged the raiders on their expedition, in 867 there was a local revolt by the Cokingi and Rorik was driven out of Frisia.

In June 873, Harald's son Rudolf Haraldsson invaded Oostergo, attempting to forcefully recover Danegeld (tribute), from the Frisians living under the fiefdom which his father established. The Frisians replied that they only owed taxes to their king, Louis the German, and his sons. With the counsel of an unnamed Scandinavian Christian, the fourth  Hessel Hermana led Frisians to victory in a battle against 800 Danish Vikings. Rudolf Haraldsson and 500 other Vikings were killed in battle and the rest were routed. The Frisians won but Hessel lost his life.

Igo Galama was elected the fifth  in 876, he saw to the erection of dikes and reinforcement of seawalls in order to defend from the advancing ocean, and the construction of defence facilities and re-establishment of coastal surveillance in order to defend from the Viking invasions. Deeply concerned by the threat to the church and empire presented by the Viking presence in Frisia, an archbishop named Rimbert broke off his mission in Sweden and Denmark in order to call on the Frisian population to resist the invasion. In Autumn 884 he personally led them into the Battle of Norditi. In the course of the ensuing battle, the Frisian army succeeded in pushing the Vikings back into Hilgenried Bay near Norden (in the municipality of Hagermarsch) where many were surprised by the incoming tide and drowned as they fled. According to Adam of Bremen, 10,377 Vikings were killed in the battle and great treasures were captured by the Frisians, the liberated estates and captured treasures were subsequently managed as communal property. With this victory the Vikings were driven permanently out of East Frisia, although it remained under constant threat.

West Frisia (880–1101) 

In 880, Godfrid (a Viking leader of the Great Heathen Army) began to ravage Lotharingia. After the Siege of Asselt forced him to come to terms in 882, Godfrid was granted the Kennemerland, which had formerly been ruled by Rorik of Dorestad, as a vassal of Charles the Fat. Godfrid swore oaths to Charles promising never to again lay waste his kingdom and accepted Christianity and baptism. In return, Charles appointed him Duke of Frisia and gave him Gisela, daughter of Lothair II, as his wife. However, Godfrid did nothing against a Danish raid which pillaged large parts of the Low Countries in 884. One of Godfrid's followers, the local Count Gerolf of Holland, defected and plotted Godfrid's downfall with Henry of Franconia. In 885, he was summoned to Lobith for a meeting after being accused of complicity with Hugh, Duke of Alsace, in a plot to seize Lotharingia. He was killed by a group of Frisian and Saxon nobles at the connivance of Henry, who had been at odds with Hugh and was against the initial appointment of Godfrid as Duke. Four years after the murder of Godfrid, in 889, Gerolf of Holland received in fief the area Godfrid had in fief before, i.e. West Frisia (present provinces North Holland, South Holland and most of the central River area, in the Netherlands). In 922, Gerolf's son Dirk I, Count of West Frisia incorporated Friesland into the County of West Frisia.

In 989 Gosse Ludigman was elected the sixth potestaat. In 993 Arnulf, Count of Holland invaded deep into West Frisia in an attempt to compel obedience from his rebellious subjects and "proclaimed himself count of Oostergo and Westergo without ever having any authority". On 18 September a Frisian army led by Gosse defeated and killed Arnulf in a battle near Winkel in West-Friesland, in what came to be known as one of the first historical signs of the Frisian Freedom. Arnulf's wife Lutgardis of Luxemburg took over as regent of Holland until their son came of age. In June 1005, she made peace with the West Frisians through mediation by Emperor Henry II, after which the county was passed to Dirk III. But even after Dirk assumed the government of the county, she still used her family connections to acquire imperial assistance, in one instance an imperial army helped Dirk suppress a Frisian revolt.

Prior to 1018, Dirk III was a vassal of Henry II, but the bishops of Trier, Utrecht and Cologne all contested the ownership of Dirk's fiefdom, which was in a strategically important location. Utrecht, situated in the Rhine delta, was the largest trading town of the German kings in the area and traders had to sail through the territories of Dirk III, by way of the Rhine and Vecht rivers, in order to reach the North Sea. Another trade route that ran through Dirk's territory was from the city of Tiel to England.

It was along this second route that Dirk III had built a stronghold at Vlaardingen, in a newly habitable area where many Frisians had recently settled by his invitation. He was not permitted to levy tolls or hinder trade in any way, but eventually he defied imperial rule. Working together with the Frisians now living in the area, he stopped passing ships, demanding payment of tolls. Merchants from the town of Tiel sent alarmed messages to the king and Bishop Adelbold of Utrecht about acts of violence against them by Dirk's men. The count had illegally occupied lands that were claimed by the bishop of Utrecht, and had even built a castle there. The prince-bishoprics of Liège, Trier, and Cologne as well as several abbeys also had possessions in the region.

At Easter 1018, Emperor Henry II summoned a Diet in Nijmegen. He listened to the complaints of the merchants from Tiel and Bishop Adalbold II of Utrecht. Dirk was present but refused to amend his ways. Henry assigned Adelbold and Duke Godfrey to organise a punitive expedition against the rebellious Count Dirk, who then left the meeting, announcing to foil the imperial plans. Within a few months, an army would be assembled in Tiel, the most important port in the northern Low Countries. The army would sail west, along the rivers Waal and Merwede, to Dirk's stronghold in Vlaardingen.

Three more bishops would supply troops: Baldrick II of Liège, Gerhard of Cambrai and the Archbishop Heribert of Cologne. Bishop Baldrick participated personally in the trip to Vlaardingen, but on the way downriver with the imperial fleet from Tiel to Vlaardingen the bishop fell ill. At Heerewaarden he left his ship and died on the very day of the battle.

The fleet with the thousands-strong imperial army drifted down the river and moored at Vlaardingen. After disembarkation the army marched towards Count Dirk's castle. The locals, who had seen the fleet approaching, had withdrawn within the castle and "on higher grounds". Initially, Godfrey lined his men up around the castle, but then he ordered them to march towards a flat field, because it would be difficult to cross the ditches that were dug all over the place.

During this manoeuvre, hundreds of Frisians unexpectedly appeared from an ambush and attacked. Someone cried out that the duke had been killed, upon which panic broke out. The imperial warriors hurried back to their ships, which had been moved to the middle of the stream by now, because of the lowered tide. They sank away in the soggy river bank or they drowned. Meanwhile, the Frisians in the castle gestured and shouted to their countrymen on the higher areas to attack the survivors from the rear. The fleeing soldiers were finished off with javelins.

Only towards the end did Dirk III appear: he rode out of the castle, with a few retainers. They hurried towards Duke Godfrey, who was still alive and fighting, but had been cornered by the Frisians. Dirk captured Godfrey, and took him to his castle, ending the battle. The number of casualties suffered by the imperial army was enormous, while the losses on the Frisian side were minimal. After the battle, the opponents hurried to make peace again. Duke Godfrey was released promptly, and he arranged a reconciliation between Bishop Adelbold and Count Dirk III. No more armed conflicts were recorded along the banks of the Merwede for three decades after the Battle of Vlaardingen. Following this victory, Dirk III was permitted to keep his lands and he continued levying tolls. Later on, Dirk also managed to acquire more lands east of his previous domains at the expense of the Bishop of Utrecht. After the death of Emperor Henry II in 1024, Dirk supported Conrad II for the succession to the kingship.

Liudolf of Brunswick took advantage of the reign of violence by the Counts of Holland in the part of Friesland between the Vlie and the Lauwers, in order to take control of the Frisian counties Oostergo, Zuidergo and Westergo and claim the title Margrave of Frisia. He died in 1038 and was succeeded by his son, Bruno II.

After Count Dirk III's death in 1039, an affirmation and recognition of the Karelsprivilege was given by Emperor Conrad II.

Dirk IV continued the policy of his father to enlarge his possessions, developing and colonizing the low-lying peat areas of Holland and Utrecht. As a result, he came into conflict with the bishop of Utrecht, other bishops and monasteries in the surrounding area. Because of this, Emperor Henry III personally led an expedition against him in 1046, forcing Dirk to return some areas he had occupied. Shortly after the emperor had left however, Dirk started to plunder the territories of the bishops of Utrecht and Liège and made alliances with Godfrey III, Duke of Lower Lorraine and the counts of Hainaut and Flanders. After this, in 1047, the emperor returned and occupied the stronghold at Rijnsburg, which was completely destroyed. During the retreat however, the imperial army suffered severe losses, causing Dirk's allies to rise in open revolt as well in his support. On 13 January 1049 Dirk was ambushed near Dordrecht by a force of the bishops of Utrecht, Liège and Metz and killed. Bruno II was killed in 1057 in an encounter with Otto, Margrave of the Nordmark, he was succeeded by his brother Egbert I who extended his authority and estates into Frisia under the suzerainty of the Archbishop of Hamburg-Bremen before dying the very next year. Still a minor, Egbert II succeeded his father on 11 January 1068.

Dirk IV's brother and successor Floris I was involved in a war of a few Lotharingian vassals against the imperial authority. On a retreat from Zaltbommel he was ambushed and killed in battle at Nederhemert, on 28 June 1061. Dirk V succeeded his father, under the guardianship of his mother, Gertrude of Saxony. William I, Bishop of Utrecht took advantage of the young ruler, occupying territory that he had claimed in Holland. William's claim was confirmed by two charters of the emperor Henry IV (April 30, 1064, and May 2, 1064). Dirk only retained possession of lands west of the Vlie and around the mouths of the Rhine.

Gertrude and her son withdrew to the islands of Frisia, leaving William to occupy the disputed lands. In 1063 Gertrude married Robert the Frisian, the second son of Baldwin V of Flanders. Baldwin gave Dirk the Imperial Flanders as an appanage – including the islands of Frisia west of the Frisian Scheldt river. Robert then became his stepson's guardian, gaining control of the islands east of the Scheldt. Robert managed to conquer Kennemerland, but held it only briefly.

Robert therefore, in both his own right and that of Dirk, was now the ruler of all Frisia. The death of his brother Baldwin VI in 1070 led to civil war in Flanders. The claim of Robert to the guardianship of his nephew Arnulf III, Count of Flanders was disputed by Richilde, Countess of Mons and Hainaut, the widow of Baldwin VI. The issue was decided by Robert's victory at Cassel (February 1071), where Arnulf III was killed and Richilde taken prisoner.

In 1073, the Saxons, led by Magnus, Duke of Saxony and Otto of Nordheim, rebelled against emperor Henry IV. The insurrection was crushed by Duke Vratislaus II of Bohemia in the First Battle of Langensalza on 9 June 1075. Since he had proved himself an opponent of the king, Egbert II was deprived of Meissen, which was given to Vratislaus. However, Egbert drove Vratislaus from Meissen the next year and was condemned. A Frisian county then in his possession was confiscated and given to the Bishop of Utrecht.

The war in Holland and Frisia became part of a large conflict from 1075 onwards. The pope had excommunicated emperor Henry IV. William I, Bishop of Utrecht supported the emperor, while the Dirk V, Count of Holland supported Pope Gregory VII and anti-king Rudolf of Rheinfelden. Egbert II originally supported Rudolf, but eventually he and many other Saxon nobles withdrew their support and remained neutral.

While Robert was thus engaged in Flanders, an effort was made to recover the County of Holland and other lands now held by William I, Bishop of Utrecht. The people rose in revolt, but were brought back under Episcopal rule by an army under the command of Godfrey IV, Duke of Lower Lorraine, by order of the emperor. In 1076, at the request of William, Duke Godfrey visited his domains in the Frisian borderland. At Delft, the duke was murdered by revolutionaries (February 26, 1076). William of Utrecht died on April 17, 1076. Dirk V, now managing his own estate, was quick to take advantage of this favorable juncture. With the help of Robert the Frisian he raised an army and besieged Conrad of Utrecht, the successor of William, in the castle of Ysselmonde, taking him prisoner. The bishop purchased his liberty by surrendering all claim to the disputed lands in West Frisia. This territorial loss of the bishop was compensated by the emperor, who, in 1077, gave him the district of Stavore.

After the death of Otto of Nordheim in 1083, Egbert II was the most important, but also inconsistent, Saxon opponent of Henry IV. In 1085, the two were briefly reconciled and Egbert entertained Henry in Saxony in July. In September, the conflict was resumed, and in 1086 the emperor gave the Frisian districts of Oostergo and Westergo to Conrad of Utrecht. In 1087, Egbert and Henry again made peace, before bishops Hartwig of Magdeburg and Burchard of Halberstadt persuaded Egbert to turn against the king and himself aim for the crown. Bishop Hartwig's later submission to the king isolated Egbert completely. In 1088, Egbert was besieged in his castle of Gleichen for four months by Henry, but on Christmas Eve he managed to escape, during the confusion of battle, with a relief army. He was outlawed and deprived of Meissen and his Frisian possessions by a court of princes in Quedlinburg, and later again at Ratisbon in the same year. The fleeing Egbert II, undefeated but isolated, fell in combat in 1090. His remaining possessions fell to his sister Gertrude of Brunswick and her husband Henry of Nordheim. By the right of inheritance Henry stood to receive Egbert's counties in Frisia, though Meissen was granted by the Emperor to Henry I, Margrave of the Saxon Ostmark. These Frisian counties, however, had been annexed from Egbert II during the latter's rebellion in 1089 and were being administered by Conrad of Utrecht.

Dirk V was succeeded by Floris II upon his death in 1091. Floris II ended the conflict with Conrad, Bishop of Utrecht (which he inherited from his father), most likely by becoming his vassal. On 14 April 1099 Conrad of Utrecht was assassinated by a Frisian architect whom he had discharged, and who, in the opinion of some, was instigated by a certain nobleman whose domains Conrad held unjustly. The Emperor finally bestowed the counties on Henry. He immediately tried to regulate Frisian shipping and ignored the privileges granted to the town of Staveren. The Church, feeling threatened by Henry, allied with the merchant class and the townsmen. Though they received him on seeming friendly terms, he perceived their threat and tried to flee by boat. His ship was attacked at sea and sunk, Henry was killed, but his wife escaped the assault. He was buried on 10 April 1101. Later in the year Floris II was endowed with the title of Count of Holland by the bishop of Utrecht, after acquiring Rhineland, formally relinquishing the title Count of Frisia. The vacuum of power left by these two feudal dynasties marks the de facto beginning of the Frisian Freedom.

Freedom (1101–1523) 

Over the centuries, whilst feudal lords reigned in the rest of Europe, no aristocratic structures emerged in Frisia. This 'freedom' was represented abroad by redjeven who were elected from among the wealthier farmers or from elected representatives of the autonomous rural municipalities. Originally the redjeven were all judges, so-called Asega, who were appointed by the territorial lords.

Though there have been counts who lay claim to Frisia, they couldn't develop themselves as landlords because the second pillar of the feudalism (Serfdom) was completely absent in Frisia. Unlike large parts of Europe under Feudalism, in Frisia there always remained a monetary economy. The Frisian farmers mainly practised cattle breeding and combined this for centuries with trade. The serf's duties to their lord – the mandatory tributes of payment in kind – could be bought off with money by the Frisians. The Count of Holland could for some time still practice their power as judge, but lack of a local root of power eventually caused their demise. Instead, during times of crisis or dispute, potestaats were elected by the free men of Frisia. Potestaats led free Frisian armies against invading feudal lords, they also served to mediate disputes, however they held no centralized executive power of their own.

The absence of a manorial authority meant that there existed no central administration. In fact, Friesland consisted of a large number of autonomous areas. The various lands, often referred to as provinces, were controlled by the residents themselves. It also lacked any central legal or judicial system. In order to provide a systematic legal system, local leaders attempted to agree and apply rules to the entire region of Frisia. Legal and political delegates from various provinces came to meetings at the Opstalboom in Aurich, to judge, to make decisions and, if necessary, to defend their autonomy. The delegates were elected by their home province at Easter and together were called to a jury. The meetings took place once a year on the Tuesday after Pentecost. Later those meetings were also held in Groningen. Land ownership played the decisive role in this. The extensive possession of the monasteries in particular gave the abbots of the larger monasteries such as Aduard a major role in that administration. The monasteries also played a major role in establishing the law. In addition to the arrangements of the Opstalboom an attempt was tried to resort to the old law as it was recorded in the 17 Census and 24 Landrights. Even after a uniform legal system had been agreed on, the region's lack of central administration meant that there was no way to clarify the content of the law, and the enforcement of the law was left up to individual communities. If a man did not want to adhere to a judgement, the Opstalboom itself lacked the means to force him. Originally the abbots still had sufficient moral authority, but their extensive monastic ownership gave them a vested interest.

The name Opstalboom cannot be defined with certainty. The word 'opstal' has a southern Dutch origin and means a "fenced plot that the village community uses as a common pasture area". The word 'boom' means 'tree'; however, it does not necessarily have to be a living tree, it can also be a worked piece of wood, such as a boundary post, a barrier tree or a post to which cattle can be tied. As such, a possible English translation could be the 'Common Wood'. The meeting place used to be easily accessible both by water and by land. In 1833 a pyramid of boulders was built in memory of the historical significance of the Opstalboom on top of the burial mound and a park was laid out.

Friesland had no Knighthood or Ridderschap. In Friesland, the feudal idea of nobility, which gave the right of control in the country, was deemed incompatible with the "Frisian freedom". The region also had no forced labour. Some "nobles" still had a major influence in the region due to their great land ownership. The right to vote in local matters was based on the ownership of land, in which a person owning one unit of land received the right to have one vote. This meant that men owning large areas of land could cast more votes. Voting men used their influence to choose a mayor from one of the thirty municipalities, who in turn represented all of Friesland. Each city had eleven votes.

The ideas practised during the Frisian Freedom have been praised by Anarchists, such as Peter Gelderloos, for their decentralized, horizontal and democratic nature:

When his father died in 1122, Dirk VI was only seven years old and his mother, Petronilla, governed the county as regent. In 1123 she supported the uprising of her half-brother, Lothair of Supplinburg, Duke of Saxony against the Holy Roman Emperor Henry V. After Lothair had been elected king of Germany himself in 1125 he returned Leiden and Rijnland to Holland, which had both been awarded to the Bishop of Utrecht in 1064. Because Petronilla saw little ability or ambition in Dirk as he grew up, she stalled letting go of the regency when he reached adulthood, until her favourite son Floris the Black could attempt to take over the county. Floris openly revolted against Dirk and was from 1129 to 1131 recognised as Count of Holland by, amongst others, King Lothair and Andreas van Cuijk, Bishop of Utrecht. After March 1131 Dirk again appears as count of Holland alongside him, the brothers apparently having reached an agreement. Only a few months later, however, in August 1131 Floris accepted an offer from the West-Frisians to become lord of their entire territory, which reignited the conflict with his brother. After this the people from Kennemerland joined the revolt as well. A year later, in August 1132 King Lothair intervened and managed to reconcile the brothers. This did not pacify the Frisians however, who continued their revolt, which was nonetheless eventually suppressed. Later that year, on 26 October Floris the Black was ambushed near Utrecht and murdered by Herman and Godfried of Kuyk, leaving Dirk VI to rule the county on his own. King Lothair punished this act by having Herman and Godfried's castle razed and banishing the two.

Hartbert van Bierum was consecrated as bishop of Utrecht on July 24, 1139. During his rule, a rebellion occurred in the city of Groningen. After the bishop had put down the rebellion, he made an agreement with the city in which the city was not allowed to build a wall around itself – an agreement which was not kept for long.

In 1150 Saco Reinalda was elected as the seventh potestaat of Frisia, the Frisians revolted again in 1155 and plundered the area of Santpoort nearby Haarlem, but they were beaten back by the knights of Haarlem and Osdorp. The first known meeting of the Opstalboom took place in 1156 to mediate a disagreement between two East Frisian areas.

When emperor Frederick Barbarossa travelled to the Netherlands in 1165, to settle the dispute between the Floris IIII, Count of Holland and Godfrey van Rhenen the bishop of Utrecht over the Frisian territories, he came up with a solution which was virtually guaranteed to keep things as they were. He ruled that the power in the disputed lands should be wielded by both the counts and the bishops in condominium. Count and bishop should together chose a vice-count to rule in their stead. When they could not agree on a candidate, the emperor could name the vice-count himself. Because this system of government could only function when the bishop of Utrecht was a partisan of the count of Holland, usually when a younger brother of the count was named as bishop of Utrecht, usually the status quo remained. When there was a weak bishop the influence of the count in the Frisian territories was greater, but usually still limited to the coastal region opposite Holland and the important trade city of Staveren. When there was a strong bishop the influence of Holland and Utrecht cancelled each other out.

Sicko Sjaerdema was elected as the eighth potestaat by the men of Friesland in 1237. Count William II of Holland offered Sicko regional rule on the Friesian lands.

Friso-Hollandic Wars (1256–1422) 

| commander2        = 
| strength1         = 
| strength2         = 
| casualties1       = 
| casualties2       = 
}}

West Frisian War (1256–1289) 
The Frisian Freedom was recognized by the King of the Romans William II on November 3, 1248. He did this after the Frisians aided in the siege of the city of Aachen. Around the year 1250, Sjaardema made IJlst the province's capital where municipal laws were judged. Sicko had a military success in 1252, when the Frisians killed king Abel of Denmark and many of his troops in East Friesland on 12 June 1252. From 1254 to his death William II fought a number of wars against the West Frisians. He built some strong castles in Heemskerk and Haarlem and created roads for the war against the Frisians. In battle near Hoogwoud on 28 January 1256, William tried to traverse a frozen lake by himself, because he was lost, but his horse fell through the ice. In this vulnerable position, William was killed by the Frisians, who secretly buried him under the floor of a house. His body was recovered 26 years later by his son Floris V, who took terrible vengeance on the West Frisians.

In 1272 Floris unsuccessfully attacked the Frisians in a first attempt to retrieve the body of his father. In 1274 he faced an uprising by nobles led by the powerful lords Gijsbrecht IV of Amstel, Zweder of Abcoude, Arnoud of Amstel, and Herman VI van Woerden, who held lands on the border with the adjacent bishopric of Utrecht (the area of Amsterdam, Abcoude, Ijsselstein, and Woerden) at the expense of the bishop. Gijsbrecht and Herman were supported by the craftsmen of Utrecht, the peasants of Kennemerland (Alkmaar, Haarlem, and surroundings), Waterland (north of Amsterdam) and Amstelland (Amsterdam and surroundings) and the West Frisians. He assisted the weak bishop, John I of Nassau, by making a treaty with the craftsmen. The bishop would become dependent on Holland's support, and eventually added the lands of the rebellious lords to Holland in 1279. Floris gave concessions to the peasants of Kennemerland. Kennemerland was a duneland, where the farmers had far fewer rights than the farmers in the polders. Floris got rid of the Avesnes influence and switched allegiance to the Dampierres.

In 1282 Floris again attacked the troublesome Frisians in the north, defeating them at the battle of Vronen, and succeeded in retrieving the body of his father. Unlike William II and his predecessors, this time, Floris V did not attack West-Friesland from the south, but rather, he built a fleet, sailed around the coast, and came at his enemies from the rear. With this strategy, he succeeded in conquering several regions. It took the disastrous flood of 1287 and 1288 for him to finally break the resistance posed by the West Frisians. Floris V, Count of Holland succeeded in annexing West Frisia, but it was his successor John I, who achieved ultimate victory over the West Frisians in 1297. After John died without descendants in 1299, the heirs to the county of Holland were the house of Avesnes, who now controlled Hainult, Holland and Zeeland.

Reinier Camminga was elected the ninth potestaat of Frisia in 1300. When the Danes led by Eric VI of Denmark made an incursion into Oostergo in 1306 because of disputes with the Frisians, Camminga died leading an army of Frisians into a long drawn-out battle, after which the Danes retreated beyond the Lauwers. Hessel Martena was elected that same year as the tenth potestaat, Martena was particularly praised for his clever policy, calming the existing dispute between the Schieringers and Vetkopers which had developed to an extreme extent. After three centuries of the Frisian freedom, the new Dutch count William III of Holland, made an attempt to take over Friesland during his administration. In 1309, William landed with a fleet of 1500 "heads" in Gaasterland. Hessel had Count William fleeing back to his ships. In 1310, William came to a reconciliation with representatives of Westergo, whereby the Frisians of Westergo acknowledged him as count and granted him certain rights in their territory in exchange for him recognising certain privileges of theirs. William III had thought he would be able to quietly assume more rights over time, but the Frisians had no intention of letting him do that, and he got nowhere. After the death of Hessel Martena on 16 August 1312, the conflict between the Vetkopers and Schieringers erupted again. The parties could not even agree about the appointment of a next .

In 1323, the Randomes of the Opstalboom were adopted as a unification of Frisian law. Meanwhile, the agreement between Holland and the Frisians fell apart when William III of Holland got impatient with Frisian intransigence and the Frisians started expelling Hollanders and their Frisian supporters. In 1324 the rebellion was in full swing and in 1325 it swept through Staveren. From 1325 to 1327 there were open hostilities, mainly at sea, between Hollanders and Frisians. Representatives of Staveren opened negotiations with the Hollanders in 1327, which led to a new agreement the next year, mainly on the same terms as the one from 1310, although Westergo did make some concessions on the appointments of certain officials. But in 1337 William III died, and his successor, William IV of Holland was recognised only in Staveren, as Westergo used the succession to break away from the formal authority of the counts of Holland. This resulted in renewed hostilities, again mainly at sea, between Hollandic and Frisian ships. In March 1338, the "judges, counselors and communities of all Frisian countries" gathered in Appingedam, in order to sign a treaty with King Philip VI of France, ratified with the seal of the Opstalboom; this allied Frisia with the House of Valois during the Hundred Years' War.

In 1344 the pro-Holland party in Staveren was defeated, and Staveren also broke away from the count's authority. In the same year negotiations took place, but the Frisians had, apparently, stiffened their spines since 1327, and refused to make concessions. With a true knight errant as the new count of Holland, this made war virtually inevitable.

Friso-Hollandic War (1345–1422)

Battle of Warns (1345–1348) 

After the Hollandic counts completed their conquest of West Frisia they planned the conquest of Middle Frisia. William IV of Holland called his vassals together and prepared a military action to conquer Middle Frisia, crossing the Zuiderzee with a large fleet and with the help of French and Flemish knights, some of whom had just returned from a crusade. On 26 September 1345 they landed between the villages of Mirns and Laaxum. Before the battle, a party of knights, led by William's uncle, John of Beaumont, went ashore south of Staveren, and captured the monastery of Sint-Odulphus monastery which they planned to use as a fortification. The Hollandic knights wore armour, but had no horses as there was not enough room in the ships, which were full of building materials and supplies. William's troops set fire to the abandoned villages of Laaxum and Warns and started to advance towards Stavoren. William continued the attack in haste without waiting for his archers. With a small group of 500 men he reached St. Odulphusklooster because the Frisians purposely moved back. At the village of Warns the outraged Frisian population, led by a few headlings, came at the knights with whatever weapons came to hand, mainly farm implements. With their heavy armor the knights were no match for the furious Frisian farmers and fishermen. The path the Hollandic knights choose to flee led straight to the Red Cliffs. As they fled they entered a swamp where they were decisively beaten. Their Commander William IV of Holland was killed. The Frisians attacked John of Beaumont, who had not participated until then, and he ordered a retreat back to the ships. The Frisians could beat him because his camp was chosen poorly with the sea in the back so that his army could never retreat. The Frisians took the battle with the Hollanders in the water where they beat them down. Only a few of the Hollanders made it back to Amsterdam. This battle marked one of the last victories for the Frisian Freedom.

Following the death of William IV of Holland, Emperor Louis IV repealed the rights of the Frisians to freedom and granted Friesland to his wife Empress Margaret II, Countess of Hainaut.

Margaret was prepared to hand the three counties over to her son William I, Duke of Bavaria, but only under certain preconditions. This led to a flare-up of the civil war between the Hook and Cod parties, with the bourgeois city-dwelling 'Cods' trying to bring William to the countship without any preconditions, while the conservative noble 'Hooks' remained faithful to Margaret. It was clear that there could be no new attack on the Frisians under these circumstances, so apart from some confiscations of Frisian property in Holland, and a renewal of the hostilities at sea, the Frisian issue disappeared into the background.

Long Truce (1348–1396) 

After the Frisians had expressed regret for the death of William IV, on 2 May 1348, the way was free for negotiations about a truce, which went into effect on 22 June. The 'Cods' delivered the countship to William I, Duke of Bavaria, who, as it turned out, came back mad from a trip to England in 1357. Thereupon his younger brother, Albert I, Duke of Bavaria, was called to Holland to succeed him, which led to another flare-up in the civil war when a third brother, Louis the Roman, tried to take the countship for himself, with the support of the Hoek nobles. When the truce was almost over, peace negotiations were started, but these led to nothing. Albert of Bavaria demanded effective control over the Frisian territories, while the Frisians, having fought and won, refused to give in. This resulted in a long period of truce, which was extended each time for periods of at most a year.

On 9 September 1361 an assembly took place in the city of Groningen with the participation of judges from Westergo, Oostergo, Humsterland, Hunsingo, Fivelingo, Oldambt, Reiderland, Eemsland and Broekmerland, together with monarchs and other clergymen. It was decided to renew the legendary covenant of the Opstalboom for a period of six years, while also agreeing that from now on the meetings would take place every year in the A-church in Groningen. A large number of treaties and meetings were concluded in the following years. The city was also presented as a strongly Frisian town, and as a champion of the Frisian Freedom, and that the power of the city also enabled it to monitor compliance with those judgments.

Following an economic downturn that began in Friesland in the mid-14th century, accompanied by a decline in monasteries and other communal institutions, social discord led to the emergence of untitled nobles called  ("headmen"), wealthy landowners possessing large tracts of land and fortified homes. The  derived their nobility not from having lands and titles conferred on them by King or Emperor but assumed power after the demise of the Hollandic counts before them. The  took over the role of the judiciary as well offering protection to their local inhabitants. Internal struggles between regional leaders resulted in bloody conflicts and the alignment of regions along two opposing parties: the Vetkopers and Schieringers. The party feuds became so fierce that the Ommelanden (Friesland between Lauwers and Ems) placed itself under the protection of Groningen. After the death of his father Ocko I tom Brok returned to Frisia in 1378, causing a power struggle for control of East Frisia to break out between the Tom Brok and Abdena families. On July 4, 1380, around Arum a battle occurred between the Schieringer monks of Ludingakerk (near Midlum) and Vetkoper monks of Oldeklooster (near Hartwert), where a total of more than 130 men died. The Schieringer Gale Hania, was severely injured, and was taken back to Ludingakerk. In 1389 Ocko I tom Brok was murdered near the district of Aurich Castle, he was succeeded by his son Widzel who attempted to build the tom Brok family into a dynasty.

The main reasons for this sudden return to prominence of the Frisian matter, seem to have had virtually nothing to do with the Frisians themselves. In Holland, the leaders of the 'Hook' party had been banned since 1393, and Albert I, Duke of Bavaria had had a falling-out with his son and heir, William II, Duke of Bavaria, who was very pro-Hook and anti-Cod. Shortly before 1396 though, there was a reconciliation between father and son, which was also meant to heal the rift between the Hoeks and Kabeljauws, promoting their newfound unity at home by making war abroad. Albert I, Duke of Bavaria called his vassals from all over the Netherlands to fight for his feudal rights to Frisian territory. Furthermore, the bishop of Utrecht, Frederik III van Blankenheim, had been very active in the north of late. In 1395 he captured the stronghold of Coevorden, in Drenthe, and if Albert was not quick the bishop grab the Frisian territories from under his nose.

Invasion of Frisia (1396–1399) 

Albert I, Duke of Bavaria received support from the Kings of England and France and the Duke of Burgundy, who all sent contingents of knights and men-at-arms. To respond to this threat, the Vetkopers and Schieringers briefly put aside their differences and elected Juw Juwinga, a headling from the city of Bolsward, as the eleventh potestaat of Friesland. He advised luring the enemy into Friesland, where they were strongest. In August 1396 an army of perhaps 9,000 men, led by Albert and William of Ostrevant, landed near Kuinre, which was actually just outside the Frisian borders. However, the Schieringers were waiting for them on the coastline, and the landing cost the Hollanders many lives. After the landing the Frisian strategy was to prevent the Hollanders from leaving the coast and coming inland. Juw Juwinga was one of only a few who argued against this strategy, saying that the Frisians should go home and let the Hollanders try to fight the marshy terrain. He was, however, outvoted.

On 29 August a battle took place at the stronghold of Kuinre. The Frisians were drawn up in a trench they had dug, behind an earthen wall. The Hollanders stormed the wall and a group of Hainautian nobles managed to get into the trench and break through the Frisian line, then attack it from the rear. At this, the Frisians broke and fled; numbers of casualties on their side range from 400 to 3,000. Most chronicles name Juw Juwinga as among the Frisian dead. After the battle, Albert of Bavaria remained at Kuinre for a few more days, but, as Juw Juwinga had predicted, he found it very difficult to operate in the marshy terrain with an army of knights. Furthermore, it started to rain all day, while the sea got more and more tempestuous. On 6 September he gave up and went home, after a campaign of only ten days and with no gains other than revenge for the defeat of 1345 to show for it.

The Schieringers Sytse Dekama and Gale Hania returned after seven years of service abroad with foreign powers. When they returned they found their two stinses at Weidum destroyed by Vetkopers. The Schieringers elected Sytse Dekama as the twelfth potestaat and Gale Hania as the thirteenth, later the Vetkopers elected Odo Botnia the fourteenth potestaat. This was the reason for the battle between Marssum and Dronrijp, which took place on August 18, 1397 where Odo Botnia was severely injured. Frisians attempted to mount a defense of the coastline from Dutch attacks, notably at the city of Hindelopen and on the island of Terschelling, but these ended in débâcles.

In 1398 a new large scale campaign was launched. The army, led by William of Ostrevant, landed without problems at Lemmer, and marched along the south coast of Friesland, which is sandy rather than marshy, to the city of Staveren. After a violent skirmish negotiations were commenced, and William was offered a treaty by the leaders of the Vetkoper party in Westergo and Oostergo. Within two weeks the negotiations resulted in the recognition of Albert of Bavaria as Lord of Friesland. Even the right of the count to appoint officials, which had up until then always been a sticking point in negotiations between the Frisians and the Hollanders, was quickly smoothed over: the Frisians acknowledged this right, as long as the appointed officials were Frisians, not Hollanders. After that Albert wasted no time to take up the administration of his new lands; for instance, on 26 August he appointed eight bailiffs, who, unsurprisingly were all Vetkopers. The Schieringers expelled the Vetkopers from Groningen as "enemies" and "traitors".

In September 1398, new problems arose for the Hollanders: an insurrection against their rule broke out in Achtkarspelen, a small Frisian territory on the eastern border of Oostergo. Albert sent 250 English mercenaries to quash the unrest, which was quickly achieved, but the event made clear that Hollandic domination in the Frisian territories could not stop at the eastern border of Oostergo, because then the free territories which lay further east, across the Lauwers river, would always remain a threat to the count's rule. Albert's solution was to ally himself with representatives of the Vetkoper party from the major Frisian territories between the Lauwers and the Ems: Hunsingo, Fivelgo, and Oldambt. Even further eastward he found an ally in Widzel tom Brok, who was at that time the most influential headling in East Friesland. This policy brought Albert in direct conflict with the powerful city of Groningen, which lay south of Hunsingo and Fivelgo, and southwest of Oldambt, and viewed these territories as her own backyard. Negotiations between the count and the city led nowhere and were abandoned, probably before year's end. In February 1399 there was a reconciliation between Groningen and its nominal overlord, Frederick of Blankenheim the bishop of Utrecht, which shows the city was making preparations to go to war. Meanwhile, Albert was also preparing for yet another campaign in the Frisian territories.

In April a new insurrection broke out in Achtkarspelen, and while William of Ostrevant scrambled to get his army across the Zuiderzee to meet this new threat, the message reached him that the Frisians were besieging the city of Dokkum, a stronghold of major importance to the Hollanders in the north of Oostergo, not far from Achtkarspelen. Once across the water, in Staveren, news reached him of major set-back: Widzel tom Brok had been killed in the Battle of Detern against the Saterlandic Frisians. This meant Holland had lost its most powerful ally in the Frisian territories, one who had probably been meant to attack Groningen from the east.

While he waited for reinforcements from Holland, William of Ostrevant sent Gerard of Heemskerk, Lord of Oosthuizen around the coast of Westergo and Oostergo to reinforce the garrison of Dokkum. On 28 May, William of Ostrevant set out from Staveren with his main force. He crossed overland to the village of Holwerd, on the north coast, close to Dokkum, where the Frisians made an abortive attack on his camp. On the next day (2 June) he relieved Dokkum, after which he built a fortress at Ter Luine, east of the city, on the southern bank of the Dokkumerdiep, which connected Dokkum to the sea. At Ter Luine, the Hollanders had to repel several Frisian attacks. Furthermore, they burned down the village of Kollum, which lay directly south of their position, around 16 June.

Meanwhile, the Hollandic army building a fortress at Ter Luine had the city of Groningen worried. In the first week of June the city asked the bishop of Utrecht and the IJssel cities of Deventer, Kampen, and Zwolle for military assistance. Furthermore, Groningen allied itself with the Schieringers in Hunsingo, Fivelgo and Oldambt, who were afraid they would be driven from their lands if the Hollanders – and with them the Vetkopers – won the day. In Fivelgo, the Schieringers burned down the vicarage of Westeremden and they captured a fortress and drowned the Hollanders the Damsterdiep. However, the Schieringers realised they could not defeat the main Hollandic force at Ter Luine. So, instead they sought refuge in the city of Groningen, which almost doubled its garrison. The Schieringers and Groningers together attacked the fortress at Ter Luine, but they were beaten back.

Eventually William of Ostrevant realised he was getting nowhere, and decided to return to Staveren while leaving Ter Luine garrisoned. This retreat was made around the Frisian coast, not overland as he had come, and an incident during it illustrated how little control the Hollanders had left in the eastern part of Oostergo: when two Hollandic boats were stranded by the tide, they were attacked by the Frisians from Achtkarspelen and Kollumerland, and burned with all their passengers and crew.

Meanwhile, in the rest of Oostergo and in Westergo resistance against the Hollanders flared up in many places. Vetkoper officials appointed by the count were in fear of their life and could not let their guard down anywhere, as is shown by the fate of Simon van Zaanden, the steward of Oostergo and Westergo, who was murdered in the monastery of Klaarkamp, and the Vetkoper potestaat Odo Botnia who also died that year. Around the middle of June there was open insurrection in the area surrounding the city of Leeuwarden, the capital of Oostergo, and in the area directly inland from Staveren. This insurrection can seen as a consequence of the willful disturbance by count Albert of the precarious internal relations of the Frisian territories. Elevating the Vetkopers inherently made Schieringers his enemies. Then he aggravated the situation by starting to feudalise Oostergo and Westergo, that is to say, he enfeoffed Vetkopers with the lordly rights in a lot of villages, not caring whether or not those villages already had headlings. Besides headlings some monasteries also took a prominent part in the uprising, especially the Cistercian monasteries of Klaarkamp, Bloemkamp, and Gerkesklooster, who were known for their pro-Schieringer stance (some hold that the war between the Schieringers and the Vetkopers originated as a feud between the Cistercian monks and their Norbertine counterparts).

By September it had become a general uprising and the Hollanders were driven into retreat everywhere. The fortress at Ter Luine was taken relatively early, probably in the middle of July. It was besieged by a large Frisian force and stormed day and night. The garrison of 200 men was not a match for this and asked for a free retreat, which was granted. Thereupon the city of Dokkum was besieged by Frisians from Oostergo, Achtkarspelen and the Frisian territories across the Lauwers, as well as by men of Groningen. The garrison surrendered around the beginning of September. Close to Leeuwarden the Cammingaburg, the castle of Gerard Camminga, one of Albert's main supporters in Oostergo, was also besieged and captured. Close to the city of Sneek the same fate befell the Rodenburg, the castle of Renik of Sneek, one of Albert's supporters in southern Westergo. Most of the Vetkoper headlings Albert had appointed to prominent positions had to flee to Holland at this point. Some Vetkopers like Sjoerd Wiarda and Haring Harinxma defected to the Schieringers. Thereafter Sjoerd Wiarda was elected the fifteenth potestaat by the Schieringers of Oostergo and Haring Harinxma was elected the sixteenth potestaat by the Schieringers of Westergo.

Siege of Staveren (1399–1411) 

In the autumn of 1399 the Frisians began the siege of Staveren, the last city still under the control of the Hollanders. The Frisians could not take the city, and the Hollanders could not control the countryside. Albert of Bavaria tried several times to raise a force for another Frisian campaign, but his efforts came to nothing. This situation lasted until a six-year truce was negotiated, which went into effect on 16 October 1401. In the next years the war was mainly fought at sea again, but around Staveren the situation remained very tense.

Frederik III van Blankenheim, the bishop of Utrecht, decided now was his time to extend his influence in the north. Now that the danger posed by the Hollanders had been averted, the city of Groningen, nominally a possession of the bishopric of Utrecht, again held itself aloof from its overlord. So the bishop stepped into the gap left by the retreating Hollanders, and allied himself with the Vetkopers in Hunsingo, Fivelgo and Oldambt, which led to renewed civil war in those territories, resulting in a resounding victory of the Schieringers, who were again supported by Groningen. Frederik III van Blankenheim reacted to this by calling up his vassals and marching northward. In June 1401 he besieged Groningen, but because the city had taken in a large contingent of Schieringer Frisians, besiegers and besieged were matched in strength. After three weeks negotiations yielded a truce, and the siege was lifted.

The six-year truce between Holland and the Frisians came to an end in the winter of 1403–1404, when it was violated by latent hostilities, mainly initiated from the side of the Frisians, who were still determined to retake Staveren. At this time, Holland was, however, yet again preoccupied with its own internal affairs. On 16 December 1404, Albert of Bavaria died, and was succeeded as count of Holland, Zeeland and Hainaut by William II, Duke of Bavaria

From 1404 to 1406 a furious privateering war raged on the sea, which again led to trade coming to a standstill. In 1406, mediation by some Hanseatic cities, Lübeck, Hamburg, Stralsund, Wismar, and Danzig among them, led to a one-year truce, which was renewed in 1407, 1408, and 1409. In 1410, the truce expired without the parties having been able to reach an agreement on an extension. As a result, the hostilities at sea were resumed. When the winter of 1410–1411 turned out to be so severe that travel across the Zuiderzee was made impossible by ice-drift, the Frisians decided to try to make use of the situation by trying to capture Staveren (which could not now be resupplied from Holland). In the night of 4 March 1411 some Frisians crossed the frozen moat, climbed the city walls and managed to open the gates to their army. In this way the last Hollandic stronghold in Friesland was retaken.

William did not immediately react to this setback; he had been receiving messages of the raids his 'Hook' enemy William, Lord of Arkel was making on his territories. So in June 1411 he made a truce with the Frisians, which was renewed in the following month. When he began organising a campaign for the middle of August, the Frisians became somewhat more accommodating, and a three-year truce could be negotiated, and the campaign was called off. Under the terms of this truce Hollandic merchants got access to coastal towns and villages in Oostergo and Westergo from Dokkum in the northeast all the way around to Lemmer in the southeast; the Vetkoper refugees were allowed to return home; and William was awarded a large sum of money.

Great Frisian War (1413–1422) 

Tensions rose again in August 1413, when pirates from Emden attacked Everd Idzinga's servants. Idzinga was an ally of Keno II tom Brok who took the matter seriously and referred the matter to the council of the city of Groningen. The council agreed with Keno and forced Hisko Abdena to compensate the damage. When the payment was not made on time, Keno felt that his honor had been compromised, and he attacked the city of Emden, which was the capital of the Abdena family. After a brief struggle in East Frisia, on October 21, 1413, Emden fell into the hands of Keno II tom Brok and Hisko Abdena fled to the Ommelanden. When he arrived at the city of Groningen, it appeared to be strongly influenced by the Vetkopers, as the city council refused to admit him. This aroused the anger of the local Schieringers. Led by Coppen Jarges, the city council was pushed aside and Hisko was allowed to enter the city. The Vetkopers from Groningen and the Ommelanden sought refuge with Keno, who set himself up as a leader. Tom Brok captured Termunten, west of the Ems river, and became such a threat to Groningen, that church treasures were melted down to pay for a mercenary army to protect the city. The Allied party made plans to regain possession of Groningen and brought together a large fleet. While the fleet waited for the arrival of the Schieringers, many Ommelanden allies of Keno tom Brok came together in Eelde.

In the night of 14 September 1415 the Vetkopers took Groningen. When the Keno fleet landed, Coppen fled with the Schieringer army to Kampen and from there to Sneek and later to Bolsward. Coppen wanted to return as quickly as possible to regain control of Groningen and re-formed his armed forces in Westerlauwers Friesland. He also expanded it by convincing other Schieringers to fight against Keno and his party. He received unexpected help from Sigismund, Holy Roman Emperor. The center of gravity of the war shifted from East Friesland and the city of Groningen, to the west of the Ommelanden.

At this point, the Schieringers were in power in Oostergo and Westergo, and the Vetkopers in Hunsingo, Fivelgo, Oldambt, Groningen and a large part of East Frisia. Neither party found this situation satisfactory, and of course the Schieringer exiles from the Vetkoper territories and vice versa formed a greatly destabilising factor. In 1416, a battle took place at Oxwerderzijl, in which the Schieringer force from Oostergo and Westergo was almost completely destroyed. At the beginning of June 1417, a strong Schieringer army set out from Westerlauwers Friesland to conquer the city of Groningen. Along the way, the monastery of Aduard was first taken to be used as reinforcement. Meanwhile, Keno had his army come over from East Friesland to help the people of Ommeland. On June 18, both parties came face-to-face again at Okswerderzijl. The Franeker chief Sicko Sjaerda led the Schieringertroep and Keno was at the head of the Allies. The battle was won by the Allies but Keno lost his life in the process, his son Ocko II tom Brok succeeded him as chief of East Frisia and leader of the Allied party. On the Schieringer's side, more than 500 fighters died and 400 were captured, the remaining Schieringers fled. Two days after the victory, Groningen, Hunsingo and Fivelgo entered into a new alliance in which they promised each other that they would no longer recognize a foreign ruler. Part of the Allied army remained behind in Groningen. They started the pursuit of the Schieringers who had fled to Achtkarspelen.

William II, Duke of Bavaria died on 31 May 1417, without having achieved anything else with regard to the Frisian war. His death caused a renewed flare-up of the Hook and Cod wars, when his younger brother John III, Duke of Bavaria, with the support of the Cods, tried to take the countship from William's daughter Jacqueline, Countess of Hainaut, who had the support of the Hooks. As a result of the succession conflict, the status of the Frisian Freedom was reaffirmed by Emperor Sigismund.

Due to the defeat at Okswerderzijl, the Schieringer party in Friesland was seriously weakened. The Schieringers sought help and thought they had found it with the Roman king Sigismund. Although he promised support, he did not send military forces. This allowed the Allied army in Achtkarspelen to continue unimpeded to impose their will on the Schieringers in Westerlauwers Friesland. Only at sea did they succeed in bothering the Allies - through piracy. For the pirates, the city of Dokkum with its fortifications was of great strategic importance. That is why the Allied army, under the leadership of Fokko Ukena, attacked it in 1418. It didn't take them much trouble to get hold of the city. Dokkum was burned and militarily rendered harmless by demolishing the city walls. The majority of the armed Schieringers, however, remained at the Ezumazijl stins, where the battle was moving towards. Things were much worse at Ezumazijl than at Dokkum – the attackers had almost given up, when the defenders surrendered and the fortress was taken.

By defeating the Schieringers on their own soil, the Allies delivered the Schieringers a crushing blow. The power of the Schieringers was as good as broken and they were willing to make peace with the victors. To stop the looting, they paid an estimate of several thousand Franconian shields. After that, the Allied army left and the peace talks started. The talks were at an advanced stage when on 29 August 1419 the Schieringers won a major victory over a Vetkoper army close to the city of Franeker, the capital of Westergo.

The Schieringers went in search of new allies, this way they strengthened a number of attacks on Vetkoperse strongholds in Westerlauwers Friesland. On April 30, 1420, they conquered the city of Bolsward from the Vetkopers. The Allies reacted immediately and under the leadership of Fokko Ukena a fleet sailed via the Vlie towards Hindeloopen. The Schieringers were surprised by the rapid arrival of Ukena, but managed to get an army up and running soon. The leadership of this army was again in the hands of Sikke Sjaarda and on 12 May 1420 both armies were facing each other at Hindeloopen. For Fokko and Sikke it was the second time they met on the battlefield, and again Fokko came out as the victor. He imprisoned many Schieringers, but a large number managed to escape to Sloten and Stavoren. Fokko went to Sloten, where Sikke was staying, and besieged the city.

This led the besieged Schieringers to openly start negotiations with John III, Duke of Bavaria, who had defeated the Hooks and had finally taken the countship. However, in 1420, the Hooks had risen again, this time with the support of bishop Frederik III van Blankenheim, and the cities of Utrecht and Amersfoort. When the Schieringers came asking for his support, John was busy besieging the city of Leiden, so he had no aid to give them at that time. Still, on 4 November 1420 the negotiations resulted in a treaty between John of Bavaria and the Schieringers, and at the end of November John sent a small army across the Zuiderzee. The Allies were surprised by the arrival of this army to Friesland and the siege of Sloten was broken, but Focko Ukena managed to escape. Around the end of the year, an army of Vetkopers led by Fokko captured Staveren, and thereupon the cities of Workum and Bolsward, and the village of Makkum as well, while privateers in the pay of Ocko II tom Brok took the strategic village of Lemmer, on the south coast.

After that, the Schieringers recaptured Workum and Staveren on their own, followed at the end of April by Bolsward, and then Dokkum. On 4 April the Schieringers of Oostergo and Westergo acknowledged John III, Duke of Bavaria as their lord. However, his success was short-lived. On 1 September 1421 John concluded a treaty with Ocko II tom Brok and the city of Groningen, in which they divided the Frisian territories among themselves: John of Bavaria got Oostergo and Westergo, while Ocko tom Brok and Groningen got all the territories east of the Lauwers river. The Schieringers felt betrayed, especially those exiles who hoped to return to lands John had now, in effect, given away.

What followed was a Schieringer insurrection against the Hollanders, which made a very complex situation even more opaque. From this point on, everyone fought almost everyone, and the Hollanders were driven out in numerous places. The Hollandic fortress at Lemmer was captured on 18 January 1422 by Frisians from Doniawerstal, its commander was taken prisoner and executed.
The peace of Groningen (1422) marked the end of the expansion from Holland to Friesland. The alliance between Groningen and Westerkwartier was later extended to the other Ommelanden and marked the emergence of the Groningen region.

On 1 February after nine years of war, all parties involved met at Groningen to finally make peace. One of the most important points laid down in the treaty was the maintenance of "Frisian freedom"; foreign rulers must be banned from Friesland. This took place behind John of Bavaria's back, and when he got wind of it, he demanded it to be rescinded. But at this point he had lost almost all his support in the Frisian territories. His last stronghold there was the city of Dokkum, on the north coast, which was held for him mainly by privateers, who preyed on the ships plying the trade route along the North Sea coast. At the end of May a fleet from the cities of Groningen, Hamburg, and Lübeck sailed to Dokkum, and drove the privateers out, thus depriving John of this last foothold on Frisian soil, marking the end of Hollandic expansion into Friesland. In the middle of June 1422, John contacted his old Schieringer allies to see whether or not there would be any support for him left at all if he organised a new campaign to Friesland. There was not. Afterwards another truce was concluded between Holland and the Frisians, which was extended again and again without many difficulties.

Struggle for East Frisia (1422–1464) 

After the war ended, most of Hisko Abdena's followers returned to their guarantors and Ocko II tom Brok now had to share his power in East Frisia. In 1424 Ocko demanded the return of the castle which his family had gifted Focko Ukena a decade earlier, Ocko won a court case to that effect in the city of Groningen dated 6 June 1426. Focko rejected this decision and on 27 September 1426, the East Frisian peasantry rose up in rebellion against the tom Brok family's rule over East Frisia. The Bishop of Münster and many Frisian chiefs joined the Focko party, whereas Ocko received the support of the Abdenas, the Archbishop of Bremen and the counts of Hoya, Diepholz and Teklenburch. At Datern, Ocko lost to Focko in a first encounter and had to withdraw with his army to Brookmerland. At a second encounter in the Battle of the Wild Ackers between Oldeborg and Marienhafe, Ocko's army was defeated on 28 October. Ocko fled and was arrested and imprisoned in the city of Leer. After the battle, Focko Ukena tried to merge East Friesland under one rule. Focko's son Uko Fockena had even styled himself as 'Chieftain at Oldersum'. Focko Ukena himself now settled Frisian justice. The laws of Ukena were written in Middle Frisian, much like Old Frisian but already a Lower Saxon influence. Instead of the "common warfare", that was held in the city of Groningen, every 'goa', just like under the Opstalboom, got its own case law back. But these laws contained directions for judges regarding the wishes and desires of each country, clergy and community. The Frisian countries promised to assist each other so that Frisian freedom remained guaranteed. For the Frisians, the mutual movement of people was completely free, although some tolls remained.

Focko's authoritarian behavior and high taxes, however, quickly aroused much opposition. In 1428 the city of Groningen had already made an alliance with Westerkwartier that was directed against Focko. Focko is said to have become so angry about this that he killed one of his own allies. After a failed attack on Bremen, the East Frisian chiefs also revolted against Focko and Uko. Focko just could not maintain his claim. Uko found himself besieged in Oldersum castle and on 2 November 1430, gave up his claim. The peasants that he had promised freedom turned against him in favor of the senior family Cirksena, who led the Freedom Union of the Seven East Frisian countries in opposition, and in 1431, under the leadership of Edzard Cirksena, they released Ocko II tom Brok from prison and besieged Focko in his castle near Leer. Focko managed to escape by crossing the river Eem in a barrel, and he went to Münster. From there he conducted robberies and plunderings in the areas of his opponents, but in 1433 his last army was defeated. Although he had prevented Okko from claiming the County of East Frisia, Focko was unable to sustain his resistance to tom Brok and Cirksena, Focko withdrew to his castle in Dijkhuizen and started a diplomatic effort to improve his position. Okko, Focko and Uko were all dead by 1436.

East Frisians no longer interfered with the party politics to the West of the Lauwers. These started again in 1439, when the Vetkoper Galamas and the Schieringer Harinxmas vied for control of Gaasterland for nearly two decades. The Vetkoper town of Groningen, which had become the dominating force in Frisia, tried to interfere in Mid-Frisian affairs. The meddling met strong opposition in Skieringer held Westergo. However, in 1444, the three-year long Struggle in Oostergo was settled by a court in Groningen. The threat from Philip the Good drove the foundation of a "council of the Frisian countries" on 15 August 1456, under a new covenant against all landlords. Soon the Donia war (1458–1463) followed and one eruption after another; cities like Sneek, Dokkum and Leeuwarden now played a major role.

The city of Hamburg wanted to put an end to the Frisian freedom and the piracy that came with it. Hamburg therefore supported Edzard Cirksena, to establish his power all over East Friesland. After the marriage of Edzard's son Ulrich Cirksena with Uko's daughter Theda Ukena, the majority of East Frisia was united. Only the Lordships of Jever and Friedeburg could maintain their independence. Because in 1381, Ocko I tom Brok had given the territory to the count of Holland, the status of the rulers of East Frisia was unclear. The ruler of East Frisia decided to improve his situation by turning directly to the Holy Roman Emperor. As a result, Emperor Frederick III raised Ulrich in 1464 to an imperial count, thus forming the County of East Frisia - thereby bringing an end to freedom in East Frisia.

After the death of Ulrich I, Count of East Frisia, his widow Theda ruled in the name of their children, who were still minors. She added the lordship of Fredeburg to the county. Under her son Edzard I, there were quarrels with the chieftains of the Harlingerland and the Jeverland and with the prince-bishop of Münster and the Hansa-city of Hamburg. Jeverland and Harlingerland remained independent, but Butjadingen became subject to East Frisian authority.

Vetkopers and Schieringers strike back (1464–1498)

Beer Riots (1487) 
One day in July 1487, a few farmers in Leeuwarden where drinking kuit, a beer from Haarlem, in the house of a beertapper. The Schieringer farmers did not care about the prohibition of the Vetkopers. This fact comes immediately to the ears of the brewers; they storm into the house, which was probably located in the Hoekster-end, find the transgressors of the ordinance, and forbid them to drink Haarlem kuit. The farmers, who had been drinking the beer for a long time already, are not in the mood to obey. People start to fight. As time progresses, more citizens approach the clamor, forcing themselves into the house in order to help the brewers fight the farmers. The farmers walked out of the beer house, and fled to Amelandshuis. The citinzenry of Leeuwarden resented the Haarlem beer drinking farmers so much, "that they came with their guns to the stins, and wanted the transgressors of their prohibition in their hands." Pieter Cammingha, a Schieringer, was not a man to obey the command of those who surrounded his house. He was unwilling to give a couple of defenseless farmers, who by chance had fled to him, to the fury of a mob. Pieter called out to them:

But although to quiet in Leeuwarden now had more or less returned, outside a heavy tempest broke loose. Everywhere in Oostergoo and Westergoo, where the Schieringers had power, were the bells ringing to call them to arms. On 24 July 1487, together with the cities of Sneek and Franeker, the Schrieringers had brought together a force of 8000 men at the Barrahuis, about an hour south of Leeuwarden. With this they meant to attack and humiliate the Vetkoper city. The lordships and citizens set up a council, talked about the proposal, and let Jouke, pastor of the nearby Goutum, write a letter to the city of Leeuwarden, that truly commends the sensibility of the leaders of the Schieringers.

They proposed simply the restoration of the treaty of April 1482: "Everyone would be able to freely buy and sell, where-ever it pleases them; everyone would be able to peacefully walk and exist amongst others; each would in his honor, state and liberties stay as before."

As soon as the letter in Leeuwarden was read to all the citizens, Pieter Sibrantszoon, alderman of the city, gave the governance the advice to seal the letter and send it back, as Leeuwarden was not harmed in any way by the clauses of this letter. However, his advice fell on deaf ears. A whole group of citizens of Leeuwarden shouted that they would immediately beat to death those who would seal the letter, for they did not want to allow those from Westergoe to buy from or sell to those in Oostergoe.

The Schieringers did not hesitate to march from Barrahuis with all of their forces, when they heard that the Leeuwarders would not seal their letter. They attacked the city at the same day at three o'clock, at the east side near the Gardens. There the city was at that time still open. Nevertheless the Leeuwarders defended bravely, "devoutly", against the first attack, and the Schieringers left four deaths on that location. But they were not deterred by this; they repeated the attack so powerfully, that, after some of the citizens had been killed, the others fled their so bravely manned defenses and the Schieringers conquered the city. The Schieringers murdered Pieter Sibrantszoon in cold blood, after he had confessed. The richest citizens were captured and locked away in Sneek or in a countryside stinsen; the whole city was looted and robbed. Worp Lieuweszoon of Boxum was granted the control of the city by the Schieringers. Many citizens, who had fled to the defenses at the non-attacked side, went to Ige Galama of Noordwolde, the leader of all the Vetkopers in Westergoe. Strengthened by his power and troops, the Vetkoper Leeuwarders launched a guerilla war of pillage and looting against the Schieringer Sneekers.

Schieringer sell-out (1492–1498) 
After the beer riots, Leeuwarden was becoming more influenced by the Schieringers. In the course of 1492, this situation came to a head when the town's guild and guild alone regained control of the city. They immediately called for help from the Groningers, and despite the resistance of several important chapters, the city of Leeuwarden joined the Dokkumer Alliance. The Schrieringer Bocka Harinxma immediately mobilized his men and set off from Sneek with an army for Leeuwarden. But while the Sneekers marched to Leeuwarden, the Vetkoper Hottingas had secretly concluded a neutrality treaty with the Groningers. At Barrahuis, the Harinxma army was devastated. In the pursuit of the outgoing Schieringers, the Groningers and Leeuwardeners made good use of their victory by stripping all the villages between Leeuwarden and Raard and destroying a few stints of Schrieringers. After the defeat, Bocka Harinxma lost authority over Gaasterland to the Hottingas. On October 13, a Groninger messenger appeared in Sneek with a proposal for a peace treaty, the sealing of which was demanded by the Sneek city government and Harinxma. After long conversations, these same ones agreed. The peace meant that Sneek, Harinxma and those who were under its protection should not go against the Dokkumer Alliance and that residents of Westergea who wanted to connect with Groningen should be allowed. In addition, Sneek had to pay a damages of 1,750 Rhine guilders to Groningen. In 1494, Juw Dekama was elected the seventeenth potestaat of Frisia, by the Oostergo Schrieringers, at a Diet in Sneek.

In 1495 Nittert Fox occupied Bolsward and the town of Workum had to pay money to stay safe. Later on Fox and his army sought shelter in Sneek. The Schieringers Bokke Harinxma and grietman Louw Donia tried to flee the city, but were imprisoned by Fox. Fox demanded ransom for the two men. The people of Sneek asked the city of Groningen to help out. On January 14, 1496, 6,000 Forest Frisians (Frisians from around Zetel, Driefel and Schweinebrück) attacked Sneek, but were defeated by Nittert Fox and 800 Saxon soldiers. The Saxons won the victory by keeping their battlefields locked and using the shotgun-loaded siege cannons of Sneek as field artillery. In 1498 Fox and his army raided the Westerkwartier in the province of Groningen. He was employed by the duke of Saxony, Albert III, who together with Edzard I, Count of East Frisia struggled for power in Middle-Frisia. This led to a battle at Noordhorn between Fox's army and the army of the city of Groningen. This battle was won by Fox's army, but one Fox's officers was killed. To get revenge, Noordhorn and Zuidhorn were burnt down. The chieftains of the Ommelanden negotiated with Fox to avoid further destruction and paid ransom.

On February 9, 1498, a Saxon troop force of over 1500 countrymen was led by Tjerk Walta in Friesland. They come from the former hiring army of Albrecht, Duke of Saxony and fought for him against the Count of Gelre. Gradually, more and more men joined the army, while the Schieringers themselves had only a small army to meet. This army was under the command of Neithard Fucks, who was trying to get as far as possible out of the way of the Walta men who were scavenging and robbing through Friesland. The emperor's attempts at mediating a peace between the Vetkopers and Schieringers were fruitless. It seemed that the Skieringers had lost the war to the Vetkopers. The Vetkopers have a powerful ally in Groningen and control the south and east of Friesland. On 21 March 1498, a small group of Skieringers, including the potestaat Jew Dekama, secretly met with the stadholder-general of the Netherlands, Albert, Duke of Saxony in Medemblik requesting his help to drive the Groninger rulers out of Westergo. In exchange for the Saxon support, the Schieringers had to agree with Albrecht's desire for control over Friesland, which they did. Jew Dakama resigned as potestaat and Maximilian I, Holy Roman Emperor appointed Albert as hereditary potestaat and Lord of Friesland. When done, Tjerk Walta's country servants suddenly switched to Saxon service. On April 28, the city of Groningen (besieged by this new army) and the chiefs of the Ommelanden reached an agreement with Albrecht, they paid him 30,000 rhinestones and waive their rights to and in West Frisia. Thus, in the middle of 1498, the time of the Frisian Freedom drew to a close.

End of freedom (1498–1523)

Remaining conquest (1498–1515) 

To save money, Albrecht sent part of his large army home, but nearly a thousand soldiers remained under his service. Even with the smaller army, he thought the Saxon dominion could still be further strengthened. Franeker and Leeuwarden fell without resistance into the hands of Albrecht and on 1 June he sent his army under the direction of Schaumberch towards Sandveld where the resistance was more intense. In Terherne, an overwhelming force of Forest Frisians succeeds in opposing the Saxon army. Schaumberch drew him back to Sneek, but without artillery he dared not enter the Low Forests. He seems to be better off bringing his opponent to the Southwest where he has enough weapons of war to suit him. On June 5, he sets off at Stavoren.

On the early hours of Sunday morning, on June 10, 1498, the Saxon army left Starum and went down to the High Cliff. The main force of the Forest Frisians met at a Murnser Cliff on a sail and waited for reinforcements from Leeuwarden. When Schaumberg realized that there were four times as many Frisians as his own army, Fuchs devises a battle plan. He does not want the army to fight in a swampy void that can also be submerged and decides to strike in battle on the Frisians, then at half way to turn around and simulate a flight to get the Frisians past the sail . However, that plan fails because the Frisians remain stuck.

The Saxon army then crosses a path towards Warns and can reach a bridge over the Potsleat. Schaumberch also launches three more ships with artillery on the water. Again he raises his army in battle, the cannons are straightened and the houses of the village set on fire to challenge the Frisians. In the Frisians there was no clear leadership. Opinions were divided, many wanted to fight away and another crowd waited for the reinforcements. Some did not want to wait any longer and walked forward on their own, confronting the enemy and not in closed formation, but "feeding intuit" on the run. The others remained standing, resulting in two gaps.

Before the first division of the Frisians with straight spikes reached the front line of the Germans, large and small shells were shot. The Frisians aimed too high and only one German soldier was killed. However, the hail-loaded firearms of the Germans had a very large effect, for the first Frisians were on the run. The princes took to their backs, so everyone started running for his life. Peter of Thabor called it a disgrace that they fled without "craftsmanship".

In 1500, the Ommelanden and the city of Groningen massively revolted against Albert III, Duke of Saxony who had just established his reign there, his son and heir Henry IV, Duke of Saxony imposed various taxes and leases on Friesland and established his seat in the city of Franeken. The Frisian population, which was not used to being taxed or living on leased land, did not want to know anything about it. The information was received very badly and rebellion occurred at Bolsward when Hessel Martena fined notable Frisians and burned entire villages that refused to pay. The inhabitants of the area revolted against this practice, which was attacked by a number of Votkeper, which included Church Walta who organized a wide resistance to the Saxon rule. This rebellion led to the siege of Franeker where Henry was staying at the Sjaardemaslot. On May 12, 1500, the city of Franeken was besieged by an army of 16,000 angry Frisians. Poorly trained and disorganized, the Frisians did not do anything about the siege of the city, even though the Saxon occupation consisted of only three hundred tenants and some Skieringer chiefs. Despite their large differences, the Saxons managed to keep their corner long enough for reinforcements to arrive. Albert was living in East Frisia with Edzard Sirsena, when he heard that his son was besieged in Franeker. He immediately left for Friesland at the head of a large army. The Frisians tried to turn that army around and at the initiative of Groningen, a large peasant army, led by the disgruntled Vetkoper Jancko Douwama, made its way on the road towards Friesland. However, Albert's army was in no hurry to attack. Knowing that the Frisian army consisted mainly of farmers and was difficult to keep together during the early and harvest times, the Saxon army first laid siege to the city of Groningen. And what Albrecht expected came true, because after a week of waiting, the Frisian army gradually began to run low. Many did not want to wait any longer to catch their hay. On July 14 the Saxons attacked and defeated the remaining army, relieving the city. On the Frisian side, between 100 and 300 men died. Cruelty was Albrecht's revenge, the city of Leeuwarden especially had to confess it, and around him fortifications and villages were destroyed. Many Frisians, including Jancko Douwama, then fled abroad for fear of reprisals.

Albert III, Duke of Saxony returned to Emden after he was done pillaging, where he died on 12 September 1500. His eldest son George became the Duke of Saxony, whilst his younger son Henry inherited the position of hereditary potestaat. The Saxon occupation of Friesland, however, was by no means secure and was the source of constant revolts. In 1502 Jancko Douwama returned to Friesland and became one of the leaders of the disgruntled Frisians in the Saxon period. Consequently, Henry, who was of a rather inert disposition, relinquished his claims to the governorship, and in 1505 an agreement was made between the brothers by which Friesland was transferred to George. But this arrangement did not restore peace in Friesland, which remained a source of trouble to Saxony. George, Duke of Saxony then demanded that all cities and districts in Frisia pay homage to him as "eternal governor". The City of Groningen refused. Edzard I, Count of East Frisia attempted to use the situation to extend his domain into the province of Groningen and proclaimed himself "protector" of the city. Twenty-four dukes and counts took up arms against Edzard and invaded the County of East Frisia and devastated large parts of his territory. Edzard received an imperial ban from the Emperor and was excommunicated by the Pope.

In 1514, Count John V of Oldenburg attacked the Frisians in Butjadingen and defeated them in the Battle of Langwarden. Simultaneously, Henry I, Duke of Brunswick-Wolfenbüttel invaded East Frisia with an army of 20,000 men. He besieged Fortress Leerort, which was only defended by a few peasants and soldiers. However, Henry I was killed on 23 June 1514 by a targeted gunshot. His troops were then without leader and they withdrew from East Frisia. John V, in cooperation with Hero Oomkens von Esens, the Earl of Harlingerland, captured the castle at Großsander. Hero moved on and destroyed all three castles in Dornum. Edzard retreated, setting Meerhusen Abbey on fire to cover his retreat. The city of Aurich was besieged and destroyed by the fighting and pillaging troops. On another front, the Commandery at Dünebroek was plundered by soldiers of the Black Band. They went on to destroy Burmönken, Marienhafe, Leerhafe and Rispel; Friedeburg surrendered. The Black Band then attacked Oldersum. Their first attempt to capture the town, which was defended by Hicko of Oldersum and Baron Ulrich von Dornum failed on 14 June 1514. A second attempt to capture the town, on 16 August 1514, also failed. Charles II, Duke of Guelders had long held plans to conquer Friesland and now he saw the opportunity. Jancko Douwama became the leader of Charles' Guelder army, which invaded Friesland, conquering half of it. This turned the tide for Edzard I, who recaptured Großsander.

As a result of all the fighting, in 1515, George (who only actually controlled Leeuwarden, Harlingen and Franeker) sold Friesland to the future Emperor Charles V (then Duke of Burgundy) for the very moderate price of 100,000 florins. Charles appointed Floris van Egmont as the first Stadtholder of Friesland.

Frisian Peasant Rebellion (1515–1523) 

Within a short time, occupation by the Duke and his Landsknecht military force became unacceptable to many Frisians of both factions and with the support of the Duke of Gelderland, they attempted to regain their old freedoms and put an end to the de-Friesing of Friesland. The Black Band, a Landsknecht regiment in the service of George, Duke of Saxony was quartered in Franeka, to the north-east of Pier Gerlofs Donia's hometown Kimswerd. The regiment was charged with suppressing the civil war between the Vetkopers, who opposed Burgundian rule, and the Schieringers. The Black Band were notorious as a violent military force; when their pay was insufficient or lacking, they would extract payments from local villagers. On 29 January 1515, the Black Band plundered Donia's village, then raped and killed his wife, Rintze Syrtsema, before burning the whole village to the ground. Since the regiment had been employed by the Habsburg, Donia, a Schieringer, put the full blame on these authorities. After this he gathered angry peasants and some petty noblemen from Frisia and Gelderland and formed the Black Hope of Arum.

Under the leadership of Donia, they employed guerrilla tactics and achieved several victories such as the successful siege of two Hollandic castles and the city of Medemblik. They also besieged Bloemkamp Abbey until they were driven off by the troops of Lenard Swartsenburg. Donia also targeted ships that travelled the Zuiderzee and was very active in 1517, when he used his "signal ships" to attack ships in the region of the West Frisian coast, to which he also transported Geldrian forces, from the Duchy of Geldern, setting them ashore at Medemblik. Donia bore a personal enmity to Medemblik and its inhabitants as, in earlier years, soldiers from Medemblik had cooperated with the Dutch army commanded by Duke Charles, the future Emperor. Donia sank 28 Dutch ships, earning him the title "Cross of the Dutchmen".

The rebels also received financial support from Charles II, Duke of Guelders, who was in opposition to the House of Habsburg. Charles also deployed mercenaries under the command of Maarten van Rossum in their support. However, disagreements between the Duke of Guelders and Jancko concerning the planning of the governing board of Friesland, and Charles II refusing to recognize Douwama as the hereditary-lord of Frisia, eventually led to Jancko changing allegiances. With help from Jancko, Charles V began his reign in Friesland. The emperor, however, suspected that Jancko was an infiltrator for the Gelderse, so he ended up being branded by both parties as a traitor. Douwama's position of power was, in particular, opposed by Georg Schenck van Toutenburg, who would effect his demise.

Because Charles V needed to consolidate the Spanish throne and manoeuver to become Holy Roman Emperor, he lifted the Imperial ban against Edzard and invested him with East Frisia, thereby ending the Saxon feud. He also made peace with Charles II, Duke of Guelders, leaving him in control of most of Friseland, the Ommelanden and Groningen. Edzard was thus forced to vacate Groningen and to give up his expansionist plans. Domestically, he was busy trying to pacify the East Frisian chieftains. On 3 December 1517, Edzard concluded the Peace of Zetel with Henry II, Duke of Brunswick-Wolfenbüttel and John V, Count of Oldenburg, in which he ceded the "Frisian Forest" (The area around Zetel, Driefel and Schweinebrück) to Oldenburg. The city of Aurich was completely destroyed during the turmoil of the Saxon feud. After 1517, the city was rebuilt according to a plan, which was based on the fact that Aurich was an important livestock market. The emperor had invested Edzard with the Harlingerland and Edzard tried to subdue it. However, due to well-constructed fortifications at Wittmund and Esens, he met with limited success.

In 1519, Donia's health deteriorated. He retired to his farm where he died in 1520. He is buried in Sneek in the 15th-century Groote Kerk. Donia's Lieutenant Wijerd Jelckama took over the command of his forces, which then comprised over 4,000 soldiers. Jelckama also achieved some minor victories, but proved to be a less competent commander and slowly lost men. Jelckama and his soldiers indulged in acts of piracy and sacked many villages in the Frisian lands, losing the trust and support of their own people. The fact that Jelckama was less charismatic also cost him: he forged less fruitful alliances and lost more than he made. In 1522, the Habsburg force under Georg Schenck van Toutenburg resumed the offensive and pushed the Guelders forces out of Frisia. Now the tides had turned against the rebels, Charles II, Duke of Guelders withdrew his support. Losing their financial support, the rebels could then no longer afford to pay their mercenary army.

After this series of defeats, Wijerd Jelckama and the remainder of the Frisian army were captured in 1523. Jelckama and the remaining Frisian and Gelderian rebels were decapitated, whereas Jancko Douwama was imprisoned in Vilvoorde, where he died without trial after ten years of suffering. After Douwama, for 25 years the rural Frisians were led by Syds Tjaerda, alderman of Dokkum and a member of the Provincial Council of Friesland. Tjaerda opposed the centralization urge of Charles V and demanded the old rights: "States may come together if they wish; the Frisians may choose their own clergy." However, they no longer had the means to fight for these rights. Charles and George Schenck would go on to conquer Groningen and the Ommelanden, in the Battle of Heiligerlee, bringing an end to the Duke of Guelders' lordship over the region.

Frisia was now firmly in the hands of the Habsburgs, it was renamed into the Lordship of Frisia and ruled by a Stadtholder, who at the time was Georg Schenck van Toutenburg. Although still spoken at the time, the Frisian language did not have any official status. Feudal subjugation finally ended Frisian municipal independence. The Frisian language would disappear from the official written record; the last official document recorded in Frisian was in 1573. Frisian was replaced by Dutch and would not return until about 1800.

See also 

 Brokmerbrief
 Norman yoke

References

Bibliography 
 Abernethy, S., The schola Saxonum and the Borgo in Rome (2019)
 Blok, P.J., De Friezen te Rome (1902)
 Buijtenen, van M.P., De grondslag van de Friese vrijheid (The basis of the Frisian freedom) (Assen 1953).
 Folkerts, R., Die Theelacht zu Norden. Ein seit 1100 Jahren auf genossenschaftlicher Basis geführter Familienverband (1986)
 Muskens, M.P.M., De Kerk van de Friezen bij het Graf van Petrus. De geschiedenis van de kerk. De kerk in de geschiedenis (1989)
 Verweij, M., De zusterkerk van Anloo: de SS. Michele e Magno te Rome, Magnuslezing (2014)
 Vries, O., Het Heilige Roomse Rijk en de Friese Vrijheid (The Holy Roman Empire and the Frisian Freedom) (Leeuwarden 1986)

Medieval law
History of Frisia
History of Friesland
History of Groningen (province)